Frederick Louis Maytag I (July 14, 1857 – March 26, 1937) also known as F. L. Maytag, founded the Maytag Company, which eventually became the Maytag Corporation which was acquired by the Whirlpool Corporation in 2006.

Birth
F.L. Maytag was born July 14, 1857 in Elgin, Illinois. The eldest of 10 children born to German immigrants, Amelia Tonebon (1837-1905) and Daniel William Maytag (1833–1900) [the original spelling of their name was Maitag prior to immigrating to the United States, and was "Americanized" to "Maytag" upon arrival]. The full set of children were: Frederick Louis Maytag I (1857–1937); Lewis R. Maytag (1859–1943); Martha M. Maytag (1861-1955); Theodore Henry Maytag (1864–1931); Jacob E. Maytag (1866-1908); Emma Maytag (1869–1956); Daniel C. Maytag (1872–1956); Helena Maytag (1875–1881); Anna A. Maytag (1877–1964); and Viola Maytag (1880–1966). When ten years old F.L. traveled in a covered wagon with his family to a small farm near Laurel, Iowa, in 1867.

Education
F.L. Maytag attended North Central College in Naperville, Illinois, in 1872-73.

Business
In 1893, F.L., his two brothers-in-law, and George W. Parsons each contributed US$600, for a total of US$2,400, to start a new farm implement company named Parsons Band-Cutter & Self Feeder Company. This company produced threshing machines, band-cutters, and self-feeder attachments invented by Parsons.

F.L. Maytag eventually took sole control of the firm and renamed it the Maytag Company. As Maytag grew, F.L. forayed into other businesses such as the Maytag-Mason Motor Company automobiles. In the 1910s, F.L. left the day-to-day company operation in the hands of sons Elmer Henry Maytag and Lewis Bergman Maytag, to concentrate on other business areas including innovations of a washing machine with a gas powered motor branded as the Multi-Motor and a washing machine with an agitator that forced the water through the clothes branded as the Gyrafoam. These inventions proved extremely valuable as by 1927, Maytag was producing more than twice the washers of its nearest competition and had outperformed the industry with growth doubling for five consecutive years.

Even after Elmer Henry Maytag became Maytag's president in 1926, F.L. was active in promoting Maytag products, and ensuring worker happiness and often greeted employees by asking, "Is everybody happy?"

Mr. Maytag was inducted into the Junior Achievement U.S. Business Hall of Fame in 1995.

An active member in his Masonic Lodge - he was a member of Newton Lodge No. 59, Newton, Iowa, receiving degrees on April 23, May 14, and raised a Master Mason on Sept. 13, 1887.

Marriage
F.L. married Dena Bergman, and they had two sons and two daughters.  F.L. donated a  park and swimming pool to the city of Newton, Iowa, now named Maytag Park and Maytag Pool. He built and donated the Maytag Hotel and spearheaded a theater and a water plant. F.L. also built hundreds of houses for his workers, selling them on easy terms.

Death
In 1937, Frederick Maytag died of a heart ailment at Good Samaritan Hospital, near his winter home in Beverly Hills, California. He left a US$10 million estate (equivalent to $ million today).

A special train brought mourners from the east coast to Newton, Iowa, and an estimated 10,000 factory workers and salesmen formed a line five blocks long to observe the casket processional. Those who could not fit into the First Methodist Church were taken to four other churches and two halls.

He is buried in Newton Union Cemetery, Newton, Jasper County, Iowa.

Quotes 
 "In all business, there is a factor which cannot be compensated for in dollars and cents or computed by any measure. It has no relation or connection with the mercenary and is represented only by the spirit of love which the true craftsman holds for his job and the things he is trying to accomplish."
 "Is everybody happy?"

See also
F. L. Maytag II
F. L. Maytag III

References

External links
 Maytag
 Famous Iowans
 Maytag Club

1857 births
1937 deaths
People from Elgin, Illinois
People from Newton, Iowa
North Central College alumni
Frederick Louis
American businesspeople
People from Marshall County, Iowa
American people of German descent